Lee Tai-Chung (born 16 June 1959) is a Taiwanese former fencer. He competed in the individual foil and épée events at the 1984 Summer Olympics.

References

External links
 

1959 births
Living people
Taiwanese male foil fencers
Olympic fencers of Taiwan
Fencers at the 1984 Summer Olympics
Taiwanese male épée fencers